Tegmental nucleus may refer to:

 Laterodorsal tegmental nucleus
 Pedunculopontine nucleus or pedunculopontine tegmental nucleus
 Rostromedial tegmental nucleus
 Tegmental pontine reticular nucleus